RCAF Detachment Grand Bend, located near Grand Bend, Ontario, was built in 1942 as part of the British Commonwealth Air Training Plan. It was the primary relief aerodrome ("R1") for student pilots training with No. 9 Service Flying Training School at RCAF Station Centralia. Grand Bend was home to No. 1 Flying Control School from 1951 to 1957. The station was used by Centralia until 1961 when it began use with Canadian Army. It was given back to the RCAF in 1962 and was used by RCAF Station Centralia until the aerodrome closed in 1963. Subsequent owners of the property were Eagleson Construction, John Twynsta Holdings Ltd, POG Ltd (Pickling Onion Growers)and the Grand Bend Motorplex.

Aerodrome information
The aerodrome was listed with three runways as follows:

The Grand Bend Motorplex uses the original runway 13/31 as a drag racing track. Runway 01/19 is now an access to the dragstrip and also the Grand Bend Speedway oval and Grand Bend Motocross dirt bike tracks. The remaining runway 07/25 of the airfield is shared by the Grand Bend Raceway, the Grand Bend Sport Parachuting Center and some local private aircraft. The only RCAF building that remains is the hangar, with the control tower perched on top. The property was subsequently owned by Bell Aerospace, Exeter plastics and P.O.G.  The aerodrome is now operated as the Grand Bend Airport.

References

External links
 Royal Canadian Air Force website
 Bruce Forsyth's Canadian Military History Page
 Grand Bend Sport Parachuting Center
 Grand Bend Motorplex

Grand Bend
Military airbases in Ontario
Airports of the British Commonwealth Air Training Plan
Defunct airports in Ontario
Military history of Ontario
1942 establishments in Ontario